Dungannon Swifts Football Club is a Northern Irish, semi-professional football club playing in the NIFL Premiership. The club, founded in 1949, has risen from the Mid-Ulster league to the top tier in Northern Ireland since its election to the Irish League First Division in 1997. Dungannon earned promotion from Irish League First Division to the Premier Division in the 2002–03 season.

The Swifts hail from Dungannon, County Tyrone and plays their home matches at Stangmore Park. Club colours are royal blue with white trim (home strip) and yellow with a red trim (away strip).

Dungannon have a mentality of developing future players from their youth system and deploying them into the first team at a relatively young age. The clubs' current manager is Dean Shiels.

Club history

Club formation
The history of Dungannon Swifts Football Club began in 1949 with the formation of the club. The names of the founder committee members include Thomas Neill, Jimmy Sands, Maurice Graham, Alfred Burnett, Albert Kelly, George Richards, Albert Watt, Joe Meldrum Snr., Jack Fowler, John Martin and Ben Clarke.

The early years
In the 1949–50 season, the Swifts won the Mid Ulster Shield on their first attempt. The Swifts defeated Portadown Juniors 3–0 at Shamrock Park. The goalscorers were Johnson (1) and Neill (2). The remainder of the side included Blair, Carson, Pierson, Lynn, Gallery, Rice, Farrell and Henry. Seven of which were local players.

The club also entered the Irish Junior Cup, at the 2nd Round stage. However, a disjointed display; a man short for part of the game, from the newly formed side resulted in a 3–1 loss to Armagh Whites, in a match held at Beechvalley Park, Dungannon. With a first half equalizer scored by S. Stewart.

The following season, the Swifts made their entry into the Mid Ulster League. In the same season they made it through to the Alexander Cup, Foster Cup and Mid Ulster Shield where they landed runners up in each.

A league title followed in the 1951–52 season; a season in which they also finished runners-up in the Irish Junior cup – after a replay. And a league and shield double in 1955–56.

The Club also spent a number of Seasons in the Irish Junior Alliance League from the late Fifties until the league folded in the early sixties, which resulted in a return to the Mid Ulster League.

Admission into the Alliance was ratified in an I.F.A. meeting held on 26 July 1957. (It was hoped that by entering this higher grade of football; with teams being classified at Intermediate level, that it would eventually lead to entry into Irish League football.) The Swifts then began to assemble a team that would be able to compete in the Alliance League, for the forthcoming season (1957–58). A 2nd XI was formed, which entered into the Mid-Ulster League.

During the 1969–70 season the swifts won the Mid Ulster League without being defeated. The team only lost twice in total during the entire season including the Mid Ulster Shield final, when they were missing key players through injury. They also amassed a total of 158 goals for and only 29 against. The top scorer being Godfrey Clarke with 37; 12 other players had reached double figures.

Promotion to B Division
After twenty years in the Mid Ulster League, in 1972 the Swifts were promoted to the Irish League B Division where they managed a comfortable 4th spot in their first season.

Stangmore Park
1975 saw Stangmore Park become the official home of the Dungannon Swifts Football Club when they bought the land from Courtaulds Ltd and erected a temporary wooden Social Club.
The stadium holds around 3,000 people

Continued success
In the 1980–81 season the team had one of their most successful years ever and were crowned runners up in the B Division championship. The Swifts continued to show their dominance in the Bob Radcliffe Cup over the years but the 1987–88 season showed their skills in the senior Mid-Ulster Cup when they defeated Glenavon 2–1 to bring the trophy to Stangmore Park.

In August 1982, Dungannon Swifts officially unveiled their brand new club house. The purpose-built construction replaced the old wooden club house and would provide an ideal environment for club and social affairs such as bingo, dances and dinners.

Senior status
In 1997, Dungannon Swifts achieved senior status on its election to the Irish League First Division.

Promotion to Irish Premier League
The Club reached the top tier of Northern Irish Football; for the first time in their history, after being crowned champions of Division 1 in the 2002–03 season. This earned them promotion to the newly formed and extended 16 team Irish Premier League. Also manager Joe McAree was presented the First Division Manager of the Year award. The season is also notable for the 12–1 home victory against Carrick Rangers on 21 December 2002. This was the biggest post-war victory in the Irish League and the highest number of goals in the local game for over a century.

The club finished a respectable 10th position in their first season.

Gary Bownes
The 26-year-old former Ballinamallard United striker died during the 2005 close season. He had been the clubs’ top goalscorer during his debut season; with 15 goals, earning the club their highest Premier League finish. He was also the Swifts first winner of the Harp player of the month award in March 2005.

An annual pre-season Memorial Cup match between the Swifts and Ballinamallard was held up until 2015; in his memory, raising money for charity.

Setanta Cup
Dungannon Swifts qualified for the 2006 Setanta Sports Cup by finishing 4th in the Irish Premier League during the 2004/05 season. This success also earned Joe McAree the Manager of the year award. In the competition, Dungannon were drawn in a group with Cork City, Drogheda United and Portadown and failed to qualify for the semi-finals as Cork and Drogheda grabbed the top two places. Drogheda United would later win the tournament, beating Cork City in the final.

The club also qualified for the 2007 Setanta Sports Cup. However, they failed to progress to the semi-finals from their group, despite being undefeated in their home games.

Their most recent appearance was in the 2008 Setanta Sports Cup. However a disappointing campaign ended with only one draw, drawing a blank in four consecutive games, behind eventual winners Cork City, holders Drogheda United and Cliftonville.

Intertoto Cup
The club qualified for its first European games by finishing 4th in the Irish Premier League during the 2005–06 season. They played Icelandic club Knattspyrnudeild Keflavík in the first round of the 2006 UEFA Intertoto Cup. However, they lost 4–1; with the away goal scored by Swifts stalwart Johnny Montgomery, in Iceland and could not make up the deficit in the home game; drawing 0–0 at Mournview Park in Lurgan, leading to elimination at the very first stage of the tournament.

Irish Cup Final 2007 
The Club; managed at the time by Harry Fay, reached their first Irish Cup final in the 2006–07 season. They played league Champions Linfield at Windsor Park on 5 May 2007. Linfield took an early lead, before an equaliser by Rory Hamill. Linfield again took the lead through Glenn Ferguson, but the Swifts equalised shortly afterward through a Rodney McAree free kick. The game was level 2–2 at the break. No further goals were scored in the second half, taking the game into extra time. Despite Linfield dominance in extra time they failed to break the deadlock taking the Irish Cup final into penalties, for the first time. Both teams failed to score from their first two spot kicks. Linfield then converted their next three, with replies from Montgomery and McAree to make the score 3–2. The decisive kick was saved by the Linfield keeper from McAllister, to secure Linfield a successive League and Cup double.

UEFA Cup
Despite their Cup final Defeat, the club qualified for the 2007–08 UEFA Cup as Irish Cup runners-up. They faced Lithuanian A Lyga runners up FK Sūduva Marijampolė in the first qualifying round. The 1st Leg was played on 19 July 2007 at Windsor Park, Belfast. A first half goal by Mark McAllister gave the Swifts a 1–0 advantage going into the away leg. The 2nd Leg was played on 2 August 2007, at the Sūduva Stadium in Lithuania. Suduva drew level on aggregate in the first half. And despite having a man sent off with the tie level, a second half hat-trick by Andrius Urbsys meant the Lithuanian side won 4–0 on the night and 4–1 on aggregate.

League Cup victory
In the 2017/18 season the club recorded its first ever senior major trophy win, defeating Ballymena United 3–1 in the final of the BetMcLean League Cup at Windsor Park, Belfast.

European record

Overview

Matches

Current squad

Out on loan

Non-playing staff

Manager: Dean Shiels
First team coach: Chris Wright
Goalkeeping Player-Coach: Roy Carroll
u20 team manager: Dixie Robinson
Reserve team assistant manager: Jay Willis
Reserve team attendant Mark Hegarty
Under 18's manager
Kit manager: John Smyton
Team attendant: Adrian Whittle

Notable former players

 Joe Meldrum – 27 League Goals for Distillery: 1962–63 Season / Featured in European Cup tie v. Benfica
 Derek Meldrum – Featured in European Cup tie v. Benfica for Distillery
 Dick Matchett – 40 Goals: 1975–76 Season
 George Scott – Former Club Captain
 Godfrey Clarke
 Raymond Erskine
 Trevor Erskine
 Jim Nelson
 Ronnie Clarke – 35 Goals: 1984–85 Season
 Bertie McMinn – 42 Goals: 1991–92 Season
  Mark Hughes – Senior Northern Ireland International
  Mark McAllister – 2006/07 Ulster Young Footballer of the Year
  Niall McGinn – Senior Northern Ireland International
  Mark Savage – Former Club Captain
  Sean Webb – Senior Northern Ireland International
  Rory Hamill – Former Northern Ireland international
  David Scullion – Included in 2005–06 and 2006–07 NIFWA Irish League Team of the Year / U21 International
  Aiden Doyle
  Niall Doyle
 James 'Baggio' Slater
 Gary Bownes
 Rodney McAree – Ex. Liverpool Trainee & Fulham / Northern Ireland schoolboy international
 Timmy Adamson
 Johnny Montgomery
 Luke McCullough – Senior Northern Ireland International
 Andrew Mitchell – 2016/17 Danske Bank Premiership Top Scorer (25 Goals)

Managerial history
 Ben Clarke (Coach)
 Henry Shepherd
 Dick Matchett (Caretaker During 1976–77 Season)
 Godfrey Clarke (1977–78 Season)
 Peter Watson (Player-Manager)
 Eric Magee
 Armstrong Beckett
 Colin Malone (1996–2000)
 Colin Jeffers & Terry McCrory (2000–2001)
  Joe McAree (Multiple Spells > 1996, 2001–06)
  Harry Fay (2006–2008)
  John Cunningham (2008–09)
  Dixie Robinson (2009–2011)
  Rodney McAree (15 Dec 2011 – Feb 2012, Aug 2012 – Oct 2012*) *Joint Role
  Darren Murphy (Feb 2012 – October 2015)
  Rodney McAree (Oct 2015 – September 2018)
  Kris Lindsay (Sept 2018 – February 2021)
  Dean Shiels (March 2021–September  - present

Chairmen history
 Norman Black
 Alfred Burnett
 Keith Boyd (Incumbent)
 Jack Donnelly
 Jarlath Faloon
 David Flack
 Maurice Graham
 David Holmes
 Gordon Lee
 Jack Little
 Joe McAree
 Paul McCabe
 Kenneth McIlgorm
 Thomas Neill (Inaugural)

Honours

Senior honours
Northern Ireland Football League Cup: 1
2017–18
Ulster Cup: 1
2002–03
Irish League First Division: 1
2002–03
Mid-Ulster Cup: 10
1970–71, 1975–76, 1987–88, 1996–97, 2005–06, 2008–09, 2012–13, 2013–14, 2014–15, 2015–16

Intermediate honours
Irish League 'B' Division South Section: 1
1975–76
IFA Reserve League: 1
2005–06†
Irish Intermediate Cup: 2
1977–78, 1991–92
B Division Knock-out Cup: 1
1993–94
George Wilson Cup: 3
1973–74, 2003–04†, 2005–06†
Louis Moore Cup: 1
1975–76
Bob Radcliffe Cup: 9
1981–82, 1985–86, 1986–87, 1989–90, 1992–93, 1993–94, 1994–95, 1995–96, 2005–06†
Ivan Marshall Memorial Cup: 1
2016–17
† Won by reserve team

Junior honours
Mid-Ulster Shield: 4
1949–50†, 1955–56†, 1970–71†, 1993–94†
Mid-Ulster League: 5
1951–52†, 1955–56†, 1969–70, 1970–71†, 1975–76†
 Alexander Cup: 4
 1967–68†, 1969–70†, 1970–71†, 1976–77†
Mid-Ulster Youth Cup: 2
2013–14‡, 2016–17‡
 † Won by reserve team
 ‡ Won by youth team

References

External links
 Dungannon Swifts FC Website
 Dungannon Swifts Statistics and Results at the Irish Football Club Project
 Irish League Supporters

 
Association football clubs established in 1949
1949 establishments in Northern Ireland